Proadusta is an extinct genus of sea snail, a cowry, a marine gastropod mollusk in the subfamily Zonariinae of the family Cypraeidae, the cowries.

Species
 † Proadusta camiadorum Dolin & Lozouet, 2004 
 † Proadusta denticulina (Sacco, 1894) 
 † Proadusta distinguenda (Schilder, 1927) 
 † Proadusta distorta Dolin & Lozouet, 2004 
 † Proadusta elliptica Dolin & Lozouet, 2004
 † Proadusta gemmosa Dolin & Lozouet, 2004 
 † Proadusta goedertorum Groves & Squires, 1995 
 † Proadusta inaequilabiata (Sacco, 1894) 
 † Proadusta kamai (Beets, 1941) 
 † Proadusta parvissima Dolin & Lozouet, 2004 
 † Proadusta rostralina Dolin & Lozouet, 2004 
 † Proadusta selatjauensis (F. A. Schilder, 1932) 
 † Proadusta splendens (Grateloup, 1827) 
 † Proadusta subinflata (d'Orbigny, 1852) 
 † Proadusta truncata (Bronn, 1831) 
Synonyms
 † Proadusta francki Gain, Le Renard & Belliard, 2012: synonym of † Romanekia francki (Gain, Le Renard & Belliard, 2012) (original combination)

References

 Pacaud J.M. (2018). Les Cypraeoidea (Mollusca, Caenogastropoda) du Priabonien (Éocène supérieur) de Dnipro (Oblast de Dnipropetrovsk, Ukraine). Partie 1 : Cypraeidae. Xenophora Taxonomy. 20: 14–33.

External links
 Sacco, F. (1894). I molluschi dei terreni terziarii del Piemonte e della Liguria. Parte XV. (Cypraeidae, ed Amphiperasidae). Carlo Clausen, Torino, 74 pp., 3 pl.

Cypraeidae